Birge Lønquist Hansen (6 November 1945 – 27 August 2004), better known as Jodle Birge, was a Danish composer and singer. His most famous tracks were "Rigtige Venner" (Real Friends) from the Norwegian singer/songwriter Håkon Banken and "Tre hvide duer" (Three white doves). Jodle Birge sold over two million CDs. From 1992 to 2001 there was a museum for Jodle Birge in Silkeborg in Denmark.
A new and larger museum was opened on 22 July 2005.

See also
List of Danish composers

References

Further reading 
 Jodle Birge by Jørgen de Mylius

Danish composers
Male composers
Yodelers
1945 births
2004 deaths
20th-century Danish male singers

Danish Wikipedia article